The 2016 Louisiana–Monroe Warhawks football team represented the University of Louisiana at Monroe in the 2016 NCAA Division I FBS football season. The Warhawks, led by first-year head coach Matt Viator, played their home games at Malone Stadium and were members of the Sun Belt Conference.

Schedule

Schedule source:

Game summaries

Southern

@ Oklahoma

@ Georgia Southern

@ Auburn

Idaho

Texas State

@ New Mexico

@ Arkansas State

South Alabama

@ Georgia State

@ Appalachian State

Louisiana–Lafayette

References

Louisiana-Monroe
Louisiana–Monroe Warhawks football seasons
Louisiana-Monroe Warhawks football